Poeppel Corner (known as Poeppel's Corner in Queensland) at latitude 26° S and longitude 138° E is a corner of state boundaries in Australia, where the state of Queensland meets South Australia and the Northern Territory.

Geography

Poeppel Corner is about 174 km west of Birdsville, in the middle of the Simpson Desert.

New Year's Eve occurs three times each year at thirty minute intervals in Poeppel Corner (also in Cameron Corner and Surveyor Generals Corner), because it is at the intersection of three time zones.

History

Augustus Poeppel, after whom the point is named, conducted a survey in the mid-1880s to find the exact location of the central Australian colonial borders. His team used camels to drag a coolibah post to mark the intersection.  Originally the point was located in a salt lake, but it was found that the measuring chain used was a few centimetres too long. Another survey was conducted by Lawrence Wells, who relocated the post to its current position.

Tourism
As with the other three corners it is a destination for four-wheel-drive tourists.

Heritage listing
The Poeppel Corner Survey Marker is a heritage-listed site, having been added to the Queensland Heritage Register in 2012.

See also

Cameron Corner
Haddon Corner
MacCabe Corner
Surveyor Generals Corner
Geography of Australia

References

External links 

 Poeppel Corner, Australia. NASA Earth Observatory.

Borders of South Australia
Borders of Queensland
Borders of the Northern Territory
Survey marks in Queensland
Border tripoints